Bangladesh Bridge Authority is an autonomous Government body responsible for the construction and maintenance of Bridges, Tunnels, Flyovers, Over Passes, Causeway and Subway in Bangladesh. It is headquartered at Dhaka, Bangladesh. It is under the Ministry of Road Transport and Bridges.

History
The agency is responsible for the implementation of the Padma Bridge. It was involved in the Padma Bridge Corruption Scandal. However, the charge was later dismissed by both Canadian court and Bangladesh Anti-Corruption Commission

Ongoing projects
 Padma Multipurpose Bridge Project
 Support to Dhaka Elevated Expressway project
 Dhaka Elevated Expressway Project
 Construction of Multi Lane Road Tunnel under the River Karnaphuli
 Greater Dhaka Sustainable Urban Transport Project (BRT, Gazipur-Airport)
 Dhaka-Ashulia Elevated Expressway Project
 Feasibility Study Project for Subway Construction in Dhaka City
 Sajek Road Link Project- II Upgradation of Alenga-Hatikamrul-Rangpur Highway to Four Lanes (Bangladesh Bridge Authority Part -34 Kilometers)
 Dhaka Subway
 Feasibility Study Project for 5 Bridges
 Patuakhali-Amtali-Barguna-Kakichira road (R-880) Bridge Construction on Pigeon River
 Construction of Bridge on Bakerganj-Baupal Upazila Road (Z8806 & 8044) Factory River
 Bachcharanpur road (R-203) Bridge Construction on the Meghna River
 Construction of Bridge over Tetulia and Kalbadar River on Barisal-Bhola Road
 Patuakhali-Amtali-Barguna-Kakichira road (R-880) Bridge on the Bishkhali River

References

Government agencies of Bangladesh
Organisations based in Dhaka
Bridges in Bangladesh